Timo Kulonen (born November 1, 1967) is a Finnish former professional ice hockey defenceman.

Kulonen played in the SM-liiga for KalPa, HPK, Lukko and TuTo between 1986 and 1995. He played a total of 419 games and scored 47 goals and 115 assists for 162 points. He was drafted 130th overall by the Minnesota North Stars in the 1987 NHL Entry Draft but never played in North America and remained in Finland.

Kulonen always played in France for Brest Albatros Hockey and in Germany for SC Bietigheim-Bissingen.

Career statistics

References

External links

1967 births
Living people
SC Bietigheim-Bissingen players
Brest Albatros Hockey players
Finnish ice hockey defencemen
FoPS players
HPK players
KalPa players
Lukko players
Minnesota North Stars draft picks
People from Forssa
TuTo players
Sportspeople from Kanta-Häme